WACK!: Art and the Feminist Revolution  was an exhibition of international women's art presented at the Museum of Contemporary Art, Los Angeles from March 4–July 16, 2007. It later traveled to PS1 Contemporary Art Center, where it was on view February 17–May 12, 2008. The exhibition featured works from 120 artists and artists' groups from around the world.

The 2007 exhibition catalogue—also titled WACK!: Art and the Feminist Revolution—documents this first major retrospective of art and the feminist revolution. Edited by Cornelia Butler and Lisa Gabrielle Mark, it has essays by Butler, Judith Russi Kirshner, Catherine Lord, Marsha Meskimmon, Richard Meyer, Helen Molesworth, Peggy Phelan, Nelly Richard, Valerie Smith, Abigail Solomon-Godeau, and Jenni Sorkin.

WACK! surveyed work by more than 120 artists in a wide variety of media, arranged by themes including Abstraction, "Autophotography," Body as Medium, Family Stories, Gender Performance, Knowledge as Power, Making Art History, and others.

Artists included in the exhibition and catalogue

 Magdalena Abakanowicz (1930–2017), Polish sculptor and fiber artist
 Marina Abramović (born 1946), Serbian and former Yugoslavian performance artist
 Carla Accardi (1924–2014), Italian painter
 Chantal Akerman (1950–2015), Belgian film director and artist
 Helena Almeida (born 1934), Portuguese artist
 Sonia Andrade (born 1935), Brazilian artist
 Eleanor Antin (born 1935), American artist 
 Judith F. Baca (born 1946), American Chicana artist
 Mary Bauermeister (1934–2023), German artist
 Lynda Benglis (born 1941), American artist 
 Berwick Street Film Collective
 Camille Billops (1933–2019), African-American artist
 Dara Birnbaum (born 1946), American video and installation artist
 Louise Bourgeois (1911–2010), French-American artist and sculptor
 Sheila Levrant de Bretteville (born 1940), American graphic designer and artist 
 Theresa Hak Kyung Cha (1951–1982), South Korean-born American novelist and artist
 Judy Chicago (born 1939), American artist
 Lygia Clark (1920–1988), Brazilian artist
 Tee Corinne (1943–2006), American artist
 Niki de Saint Phalle (1030–2002), Jean Tinguely (1925–1991), and Per Olof Ultvedt
 Jay DeFeo (1929–1989), American artist
 Disband 
 Assia Djebar (1936–2015), Algerian filmmaker
 Rita Donagh (born 1939), British artist 
 Kirsten Dufour (born 1941), Danish artist
 Lili Dujourie (born 1941), Belgian video artist
 Mary Beth Edelson (born 1933), American artist 
 Rose English British performance artist
 VALIE EXPORT (born 1940), Austrian artist
 Jacqueline Fahey (born 1929), New Zealand painter
 Louise Fishman (1939–2021), American painter 
 Audrey Flack (born 1931), American artist
 Iole de Freitas (born 1945), Brazilian photographer and filmmaker
 Isa Genzken (born 1948), German artist
 Nancy Grossman (born 1940), American artist
 Barbara Hammer (1939–2019), American filmmaker
 Harmony Hammond (born 1944), American artist and writer
 Margaret Harrison (born 1940), English artist 
 Mary Heilmann (born 1940), American artist
 Lynn Hershman (born 1941), American artist and filmmaker 
 Eva Hesse (1936–1970), Jewish German-born American sculptor
 Susan Hiller (1940–2019), American artist
 Rebecca Horn (born 1944), German visual artist
 Alexis Hunter (1948–2014), New Zealand painter and photographer
 Mako Idemitsu (born 1940), Japanese filmmaker
 Sanja Iveković (born 1949), Croatian photographer, sculptor and installation artist
 Joan Jonas (born 1936), American video and performance artist
 Kirsten Justesen (born 1943), Danish artist
 Mary Kelly (born 1941), American conceptual artist
 Joyce Kozloff (born 1942), American artist
 Friedl Kubelka (born 1946), Austrian photographer
 Shigeko Kubota (1937–2015), Japanese-born video artist, sculptor and performance artist
 Yayoi Kusama (born 1929), Japanese artist and writer
 Ketty La Rocca (b. 1938, d. 1976), Italian artist
 Suzanne Lacy (born 1945), American artist 
 Suzy Lake (born 1947), American-Canadian artist
 Maria Lassnig (1919–2014), Austrian artist 
 Lesbian Art Project (1977–1979), participatory art movement in Los Angeles
 Lee Lozano (1930–1999), American artist
 Léa Lublin (1929–1999), Polish, Argentine, and French performance artist
 Anna Maria Maiolino (born 1942), Italian-Brazilian artist
 Mónica Mayer (born 1954), Mexican artist
 Ana Mendieta (1948–1985), Cuban American performance artist, sculptor, painter and video artist
 Annette Messager (born 1943), French visual artist
 Marta Minujín and Richard Squires
 Nasreen Mohamedi (1937–1990), Indian artist
 Linda M. Montano (born 1942), American performance artist 
 Ree Morton (1936–1977), American artist 
 Laura Mulvey and Peter Wollen (1938–2019)
 Alice Neel (1900–1984), American artist
 Senga Nengudi (born 1943), African-American artist
 Ann Newmarch (born 1945), Australian artist
 Lorraine O’Grady (born 1934),  American conceptual artist
 Pauline Oliveros (1932–2016), American composer
 Yoko Ono (born 1933), Japanese multimedia artist
 ORLAN (born 1947), French artist
 Ulrike Ottinger (born 1942), German filmmaker
 Gina Pane (1939–1990), French artist
 Catalina Parra (born 1940), Chilean artist
 Ewa Partum (born 1945), Polish-German artist
 Howardena Pindell (born 1943), American abstract artist
 Adrian Piper (born 1948), American conceptual artist
 Sylvia Plimack Mangold (born 1938), American artist, painter, printmaker, and pastelist
 Sally Potter (born 1949), English filmmaker and performance artist
 Yvonne Rainer (born 1934), American dancer, choreographer, and filmmaker
 Ursula Reuter Christiansen (born 1943), German-Danish filmmaker and painter
 Lis Rhodes (born 1942), British artist
 Faith Ringgold (born 1930) African-American artist
 Ulrike Rosenbach (born 1943), German video and performance artist 
 Martha Rosler (born 1943), American artist
 Betye Saar (born 1926), American artist
 Miriam Schapiro (1923-–2015),  Canadian-born American artist
 Mira Schendel (1919–1988),  Brazilian artist
 Carolee Schneemann (1939–2019),  American artist
 Joan Semmel (born 1932), American feminist painter
 Bonnie Sherk (born 1945), American landscape architect and performance artist
 Cindy Sherman (born 1954), American photographer
 Katharina Sieverding (born 1944), Czech photographer  
 Sylvia Sleigh (1916–2010), Welsh-born American realist painter
 Alexis Smith (born 1949), American artist
 Barbara T. Smith (born 1931), American performance artist 
 Mimi Smith (born 1942), American artist
 Juliana Snapper (born 1972), American vocalist and performance artist
 Joan Snyder (born 1940), American painter
 Valerie Solanas (1936–1988), American writer
 Annegret Soltau (born 1946), German artist
 Nancy Spero (1926–2009), American artist
 Spiderwoman Theater
 Lisa Steele (born 1947), Canadian video artist
 Sturtevant  (1924–2014), American artist
 Cosey Fanni Tutti (born 1951), English performance artist
 Mierle Laderman Ukeles (born 1939), American artist
 Cecilia Vicuña (born 1947), Chilean poet, artist and filmmaker
 June Wayne (1918–2011), American printmaker, tapestry designer and painter
 "Where We At" Black Women Artists
 Colette Whiten (born 1945), sculpture, installation and performance artist
 Faith Wilding (born 1943), Paraguayan American multidisciplinary artist
 Hannah Wilke (1940–1993), American artist
 Francesca Woodman (1958–1981), American photographer
 Nil Yalter, Judy Blum Reddy, and Nicole Croiset
 Nil Yalter (born 1938), Egyptian-French artist, co-founder of Groupe de Cinq
 Zarina (born 1937), Indian-American artist

References

External links 

Feminist art
Art exhibitions in the United States
Events in Los Angeles
2007 non-fiction books